Charles William Wallace (24 November 1884 – 5 September 1946) was an English first-class cricketer who played four first-class matches for Worcestershire in the early 1920s. His highest score was 39 not out against Hampshire in June 1922.

Notes

References
Charles Wallace from CricketArchive

English cricketers
Worcestershire cricketers
1884 births
1946 deaths
British people in colonial India